Frederick Zook is a former President of Ottawa University.  He had previously held the position of Provost of the Arizona Campus of Ottawa University from 1981 to 2001.  Previous to that, Zook was a Dean of Students and faculty member of the campus in Ottawa, Kansas.  Zook has also been a City Council member and the Mayor of the City of Ottawa.

References

Kansas city council members
Living people
People from Ottawa, Kansas
Mayors of places in Kansas
Ottawa University faculty
Year of birth missing (living people)